RAVE may refer to:

RAVE (survey) (Radial Velocity Experiment), spectroscopic astronomical survey
RAVE (known as Rave Master in English), a manga series
Radiation associated vascular ectasia, an alternative term for radiation proctitis, a medical condition associated with chronic radiation exposure to the rectum
Reducing Americans' Vulnerability to Ecstasy Act (RAVE Act)
Rendering Acceleration Virtual Engine, a low-level interface to  3D graphics cards for Mac OS and MorphOS
Routing Audio Via Ethernet, a brand of audio over Ethernet

See also
Rave (disambiguation)